Ruel Carlile Walker (February 26, 1910 – May 9, 1998) was a justice of the Supreme Court of Texas from October 19, 1954 to September 30, 1975.

References

Justices of the Texas Supreme Court
1910 births
1998 deaths
20th-century American judges